Alastair McQueen Dowell (17 April 1920 – 9 April 2010) was a Scottish cricketer. Dowell was a right-handed batsman who bowled right-arm fast-medium.

Dowell made his first-class debut for Scotland against Worcestershire in 1951. Dowell represented Scotland in 2 further first-class matches against Northamptonshire in 1953 and Lancashire in 1955. In his 3 first-class matches he took 2 wickets at a bowling average of 68.00.

Dowell died at Alloa, Clackmannanshire on 9 April 2010.

External links
Alastair Dowell at Cricinfo
Alastair Dowell at CricketArchive

1920 births
2010 deaths
Cricketers from Perth and Kinross
Scottish cricketers